Peter Grönholm (born 14 September 1958) is a Finnish fencer. He competed in the team épée events at the 1980 Summer Olympics.

References

1958 births
Living people
Finnish male épée fencers
Olympic fencers of Finland
Fencers at the 1980 Summer Olympics
Sportspeople from Helsinki